Bellulia laosiensis is a moth of the family Erebidae first described by Michael Fibiger in 2008. It is known from Laos, in Southeast Asia.

References

Micronoctuini
Taxa named by Michael Fibiger
Moths described in 2008
Moths of Asia